Fotu is a Tongan name. Notable people with this name include:

Given name
 Fotu Auelua, also known as Fotunuupule Auelua, Australian rugby union player 
 Fotu Lokotui (born 1992), Tongan rugby union player

Surname
 Isaac Fotu (born 1993), New Zealand basketball player
 Kini Fotu (born 1965), Tongan rugby union player
 Leki Fotu (born 1998), Tongan-American football defensive tackle
 Siaosi Taimani Fotu (died 1967), Tongan politician and magistrate
 Teuila Fotu-Moala, New Zealand rugby league footballer

See also
 Fotu La, India